Dame Angela Jean Ahrendts,  (born June 7, 1960) is an American businesswoman who was previously the senior vice president of retail at Apple Inc. She was the CEO of Burberry from 2006 to 2014. Ahrendts left Burberry to join Apple in 2014. Ahrendts was ranked 25th in Forbes' 2015 list of the most powerful women in the world, 9th most powerful woman in the U.K. in the BBC Radio 4 Woman's Hour 100 Power List, and 29th in Fortunes 2014 list of the world's most powerful women in business. She was also a member of the UK's Prime Minister's business advisory council until it was disbanded in 2016.

Early life 
Ahrendts was born and raised in New Palestine, Indiana, the third of six children. Her father, Richard Ahrendts, was a businessman, and her mother, Jean, was a homemaker.

She attended New Palestine High School, where she was a varsity cheerleader. In 1981, she earned an undergraduate degree in Merchandising and Marketing from Ball State University in Muncie, Indiana.

Career 
Ahrendts moved to New York City to work in the fashion industry. After a series of positions including merchandising at bra maker Warnaco, Ahrendts joined Donna Karan International in 1989, working to develop the luxury brand internationally through both wholesale and licensing. In 1996 she was hired at Henri Bendel by Leslie Wexner to expand Bendel stores to 50 new markets, but the project was cancelled by the board of directors two years later.

In 1998, she joined Fifth & Pacific Companies as vice president of corporate merchandising and design. In 2001, she was promoted to senior vice president of corporate merchandising and group president, responsible for the merchandising of the group's 20 plus brands including Laundry by Shelli Segal, Lucky Brand Dungarees and the men's retail business of Liz Claiborne Inc. In 2002, she was promoted again to serve as executive vice president, with full responsibility for the complete line of Liz Claiborne products, services and development across both women's and men's lines.

Burberry 
Ahrendts joined Burberry in January 2006, and took up the position of CEO on July 1, 2006, replacing Rose Marie Bravo. Ahrendts mitigated the brand's decline in prestige by immediately limiting the number of clothing and accessories carrying the Burberry check pattern to 10%, minimizing the damage ubiquitous counterfeits had caused to sales. She also oversaw the buying back of the brand's fragrance and beauty product licenses and the buying out of the Spanish franchise which was then generating 20% of group revenues to stop its unfettered licensing. Ahrendts says she did not model her approach after any other fashion house, but looked to world-class design as an influence, including Apple Inc. The company value rose during her tenure from £2 billion to over £7 billion. CNN Money reported that during 2012, she was the highest-paid CEO in the U.K., making $26.3 million.

Apple 
On October 15, 2013, it was announced that Ahrendts would leave Burberry in Spring 2014 to join Apple Inc. as a member of its executive team as senior vice president of retail and online stores, filling the spot vacated by John Browett in October 2012. On May 1, 2014, Apple's new SVP of Retail and Online Stores Angela Ahrendts was placed on the Apple Leadership roster, signaling her official entry into the company.

According to Apple's 2015 Proxy Statement filed with the Securities and Exchange Commission, Ahrendts earned over $70 million in 2014, more than any other executive at Apple, including CEO Tim Cook. As of August 2016, she is reported to own approximately US$11 million worth of Apple shares.

On February 5, 2019, Apple announced that Ahrendts would be leaving in April to be replaced by Deirdre O'Brien.

Board memberships 
Ahrendts is a non-executive board member of Save the Children, Ralph Lauren Corporation, Airbnb and Charity: Water. As of July 1, 2020, she is also a non-executive member of the board of WPP plc, considered the world's largest advertising company.

Awards and memberships 
 2000: Crain's New York Rising Stars 40 under 40
 2010: Awarded honorary doctorate of Humane Letters from Ball State.
 2010–present: Prime Minister's Business Advisory Group, Member
 2010: CNBC European Business Leader of the Future
 2010: Oracle World Retail Awards, Outstanding Leadership Award
 2011: St George's Society of New York, Medal of Honor
 2011 (also 2010): Financial Times Top 50 Women in World Business
 2011: Shenkar College of Engineering and Design, Honorary Fellow
 2013: Business of Fashion BoF 500
 2013: The Most Excellent Order of the British Empire, a DBE for services to British business. Made substantive in 2023.
 2013 (also 2010, 2011): Fortunes Businesspeople of the Year (2010, 2011, 2013)
 2013: Ranked #4 in Fortunes 2013 top people in business
 2013: Financial Times Women of 2013
 2013 (also 2006, 2007, 2009, 2010, 2011, 2012): Forbes 100 Most Powerful Women in the World
 2013: 9th most powerful woman in the United Kingdom by Woman's Hour on BBC Radio 4
 2014: Fast Company Most Creative People in Business
 2014 (also 2007, 2008, 2011, 2012, 2013): Fortunes 50 Most Powerful Women in Business

Personal life 
Ahrendts met her husband Gregg Couch in elementary school. They married in their 30s after a 17-year long-distance relationship. The couple has three children. When Ahrendts was working at Burberry, the family lived in a  home on an  plot west of London. Brought up a Methodist, she is still an active Christian.

See also
Outline of Apple Inc. (personnel)
History of Apple Inc.
Apple Store

References

External links
 Angela Ahrendts at Apple
 
 Angela Ahrendts  Video produced by Makers: Women Who Make America

1960 births
Living people
20th-century American businesspeople
20th-century American businesswomen
21st-century American businesspeople
21st-century American businesswomen
American businesspeople in retailing
American chief executives of fashion industry companies
American emigrants to England
Naturalised citizens of the United Kingdom
Methodists from Indiana
American women chief executives
Apple Inc. executives
Ball State University alumni
People from New Palestine, Indiana
Dames Commander of the Order of the British Empire
Women corporate executives
Burberry people
21st-century British businesswomen
21st-century British businesspeople
British businesspeople in retailing
British chief executives
British women chief executives